The  is the 31st Cabinet of Japan under the leadership of Prime Minister Keisuke Okada from July 8, 1934 to March 9, 1936.

Cabinet 
Okada was appointed on July 8, 1934 after his predecessor Saitō Makoto had resigned over the Teijin Incident. Okada's appointment dashed hopes for a revival of political party influence. His cabinet was the second "national unity cabinet" (kyokoku itchi naikaku) after the Saitō Cabinet that had marked the end of the party rule of the 1920s and early 1930s, which was the so-called Taishō Democracy. Key ministers came from the bureaucracy and the military, and other posts were held by politicians mostly from the minority Minseitō and the Shōwakai, a militarist breakaway group from the majority Seiyūkai that had refused to let its members join the Okada Cabinet.

After the attempted coup d'état in the February 26 Incident in 1936, the Okada Cabinet resigned. Following Genrō Kinmochi Saionji's recommendation, the emperor appointed foreign minister Hirota Kōki as successor leading to the formation of the Hirota Cabinet, another "national unity cabinet".

References

External links 
 Kantei, Japanese Cabinet: Okada Cabinet 
 National Diet Library: Modern Japan in Archives, Crisis in Constitutional Politics

Cabinet of Japan
1934 establishments in Japan
1936 disestablishments in Japan
Cabinets established in 1934
Cabinets disestablished in 1936